Siren Sundby (born 2 December 1982 in Lørenskog) is a former Norwegian sailor.

She won an Olympic gold medal in the Europe-class in the 2004 Summer Olympics. She also won the world championships in the Europe-class in 2003 and 2004.

Sundby was selected female sailor of the year by the International Sailing Federation in 2003.

Sundby revealed in July 2006 that she was giving up sailing. Since her sailing partner Karianne Melleby became pregnant and gave up sailing, Sundby had been looking for a new partner, but then decided that there was not enough time to prepare with a new partner before the 2008 Summer Olympics, and still have a realistic chance of winning gold.

Personal life
Her parents live in Son, south of Oslo. She lives in Oslo with her husband, Christopher Gundersen, who is a sailor. She has a Bachelor of Science in Engineering from Technical University of Denmark, 2008, and is attending her final year of the Master program, Innovation and Entrepreneurship, 2011, at BI Norwegian Business School in Oslo.

References

External links
 
 
 

ISAF World Sailor of the Year (female)
Olympic sailors of Norway
Norwegian female sailors (sport)
Sailors at the 2000 Summer Olympics – Europe
Sailors at the 2004 Summer Olympics – Europe
Sailors at the 2008 Summer Olympics – Yngling
Olympic gold medalists for Norway
1982 births
Living people
People from Lørenskog
Olympic medalists in sailing
Medalists at the 2004 Summer Olympics
Europe class world champions
World champions in sailing for Norway
Sportspeople from Viken (county)